Edward Vigil is an American politician who served in the Colorado House of Representatives from the 62nd district as a member of the Democratic Party from 2009 to 2017. He served on the county commission in Costilla County, Colorado prior to his tenure in the state house.

Early life and career

Vigil was born in San Pablo, Colorado, and married Evelyn. He graduated with a Bachelor of Arts degree in business administration and sociology from Adams State University. Vigil served on the county commission in Costilla County, Colorado. During his tenure in the state house he served as the vice-chair of the Agriculture and Natural Resources Committee and as chair of the Capitol Development Committee.

Vigil defeated Rocky White for the Democratic nomination for a seat in the Colorado House of Representatives from the 62nd district in the 2008 election and defeated Republican nominee Randy Jackson and write-in candidate Rafael Gallegos. He defeated Jackson in the 2010 election. He won reelection in the 2012 election against Republican nominee Tim Walters. He defeated Republican nominee Marcy Freeburg in the 2014 election.

Political positions

Vigil voted in favor of repealing the death penalty in 2009. He opposed legislation which would limit ammunition magazines to fifteen rounds stating mental health treatment should be made more easily available instead. His scores from the American Civil Liberties Union ranged from 89% in 2013, 100% in 2014, 60% in 2015, and 83.3% in 2016.

Electoral history

References

External links
 Campaign website

21st-century American politicians
Living people
Members of the Colorado House of Representatives
Year of birth missing (living people)